Massimo Bertagnoli (born 26 February 1999) is an Italian football player. He plays for Brescia.

Club career

Chievo
He is a product of Chievo youth teams. On 5 July 2019 he signed his first professional contract with the club for a 5-year term.

He made his professional Serie B debut for Chievo on 25 August 2019 in a game against Perugia. He started the game and played the whole match.

On 27 January 2020, he joined Fermana on loan until the end of the 2019–20 season.

On 13 August 2021 he joined Brescia.

References

External links
 

1999 births
Footballers from Verona
Living people
Italian footballers
Association football midfielders
A.C. ChievoVerona players
Fermana F.C. players
Brescia Calcio players
Serie B players
Serie C players